Djibril Sylla (born 1 January 1980) is a retired professional footballer. Born in Guinea, he was capped at international level by Malta and during his career played for teams in Malta, Wales and France.

Career

Malta
He joined Sliema Wanderers in July 2003 Sylla made his unofficial debut for the Wanderers in a friendly 5-1 drubbing of the Nigerian Stars. After playing for the club infrequently over the next season he was released by club and joined Hibernians on transfer deadline day in August 2004.

Wales
He then moved to Wales, signing for Rhyl in March 2006.

France
He finished his career in France, playing for Corsican side CA Bastia.

International
Sylla made four appearances for the Malta national football team during 2000, his debut was a second-half substitute's appearance in a friendly against South Africa. He started in Malta's 2002 World Cup qualifier at Northern Ireland in September 2000.

References

External links
 at Footballdatabase.eu
 at National-Football-Teams

1980 births
Living people
People with acquired Maltese citizenship
Maltese footballers
Malta international footballers
Association football midfielders
Rhyl F.C. players
Expatriate footballers in Wales
Hibernians F.C. players
CA Bastia players
Expatriate footballers in France
Msida Saint-Joseph F.C. players
Sliema Wanderers F.C. players
Ħamrun Spartans F.C. players
Guinean emigrants to Malta